Soyécourt is a commune in the Somme department in Hauts-de-France in northern France.

Geography

Population

Places of interest
 St.Martial's church:  The church of Soyécourt was destroyed during the First World War. The 12th century font is all that remains of the old church in the replacement building.
 Wallieux wood:  The wood of Wallieux is a World War I site and is part of the Circuit of Memory of the First World War. This wood remains pock-marked by shell holes and war tunnels.

Notable people
Camille de Soyécourt (1757–1849), daughter of  Joachim Charles de Seigliere de Belleforiere, Marquis de Soyécourt, was a French Catholic nun who restored the Carmelite Order in France after the French Revolution.

See also
Communes of the Somme department

References

Communes of Somme (department)